Lockport Air Force Station is a closed United States Air Force ADCOM General Surveillance Radar station in Cambria, New York.

History

Initially established at Fort Niagara in 1950 before relocating to Lockport site. It was a joint USAF and US Army station from 1951 to 1969. The Air Defense squadron inactivated on 29 June 1979. The key infrastructure like the three radomes (AN/FPS-7 and twin AN/FPS-6 radars) have been demolished. Today the former station is partially vacant with base apartments for private use and commercial redevelopment.

It was a part of the RCC (NORAD Regional Control Center) a SAGE network, located at Syracuse AFS.

Units

 763rd Aircraft Control and Warning Squadron - 1950
 763rd Radar Squadron (SAGE) - 1959
 763rd Radar Squadron - 1974

Assignments

 540th Aircraft Control and Warning Group 1951-1952
 32nd Air Division 1952-1953
 4704th Defense Wing 1953-1956
 4708th Defense Wing 1956
 30th Air Division 1956-1958
 Syracuse Air Defense Sector 1958-1963
  2nd Artillery Group (Air Defense) 1961-1969
 Detroit Air Defense Sector 1963-1966
 34th Air Division 1966-1969
 35th Air Division 1969
 21st Air Division 1969-1979

References

Installations of the United States Air Force in New York (state)
Radar stations of the United States Air Force
Aerospace Defense Command military installations
1951 establishments in Louisiana
1979 disestablishments in Louisiana
Military installations established in 1951
Military installations closed in 1979